An election was held on November 6, 2018 to elect all 99 members to Ohio's House of Representatives. The election coincided with the elections for other offices, including U.S. Senate, U.S. House of Representatives, state governor and state senate. The primary election was held on May 8, 2018.

Republicans retained a supermajority in the House despite a net loss of four seats, winning 62 seats compared to 37 seats for the Democrats.

Statewide results

Write-In Candidate for House District 75 was also a Green Party candidate, but labeled as write-in.

Results by district

Overview 

|}

Detailed results 
Results of the 2018 Ohio House of Representatives election by district:

Notes

References

House of Representatives
2018
Ohio House of Representatives